Acinetobacter lwoffii, formerly known as Mima polymorpha or Acinetobacter calcoaceticus var. lwoffii, is a non-fermentative Gram-negative bacillus bacterium that is a member of the genus Acinetobacter. It is considered as normal skin flora and can also inhabit the human oropharynx and perineum of up to 25% of the population. In addition to that, it can cause infections in human hosts, particularly catheter-associated infections in immunocompromised patients. It has also been associated with at least one case of gastroenteritis. Due to its ability to survive dry conditions, low pH, and a wide range of temperatures, A. lwoffii, along with A. johnsonii, has been found in frozen food, bacon, eggs, pasteurized milk, and fish. It is also resistant to many disinfectants, irradiation, and desiccation. There are also many environmental A. lwoffii strains originating for instance from a permafrost or former gold mine.

References

External links
Type strain of Acinetobacter lwoffii at BacDive -  the Bacterial Diversity Metadatabase

Moraxellaceae
Bacteria described in 1940